Prince George High School is the only public high school in Prince George County, Virginia. The school has 1354 students. Prince George High School offers grades 10-12 rather than the traditional 9-12 high school. Construction on the current facility began in 1976 and it opened for the 1977–78 school year. It replaced an earlier facility across the road from it built in the 1950s, that it shares athletic facilities with. The old high school became Prince George Junior High School when the new high school opened in 1977, and has since been renamed N.B. Clements Junior High School. Prince George High School was the first fully air-conditioned school in Prince George County. The building was expanded to add additional classrooms in the mid 1990s.

Fall sports 
Prince George High School offers cheerleading, cross country, field hockey, football, golf, boys volleyball, and girls volleyball in the fall.

Activities and clubs 
4-H club 
Art club 
Beta club 
COSM 
Cultural awareness club 
DECA 
Key club 
Model UN club 
Royal GSA
Sign language 
Chess club 
Ecology club 
Interact club 
Japanese club 
NHS 
Royals media 
Skills USA 
Student – to – student 
FBLA 
French club 
Garden club 
German club 
Junior civitan  
Mu Alpha Theta 
NAHS 
Ruri-teens 
SADD 
Spanish club 
Tri-m 
BuildOn 
Chemistry club 
FCA 
PAAS 
Red cross 
Stream team 
TSA  
Young authors young educators

Administrators 
Dr. Abbie Martin: Principal 
Mrs. Donna Branch-Harris: Assistant Principal 
Mr. Matthew McAllister: Assistant Principal 
Dr. Wyatt: Assistant Principal

Notable alumni
 Johnny Oates, MLB player and manager
 Larry Brooks, NFL Player
 John M. McBroom, Major General, US Air Force, retired
 Reggie Williams, NBA player 
 Jackie Bradley Jr., MLB Player
 Rick Gates, political consultant

References

External links 
School website

Public high schools in Virginia
Schools in Prince George County, Virginia
Educational institutions established in 1976
1976 establishments in Virginia